Chuquisaca is a department of Bolivia located in the center south. It borders on the departments of Cochabamba, Tarija, Potosí, and Santa Cruz. The departmental capital is Sucre, which is also the constitutional capital of Bolivia.

Geography
The department is traversed by the main cordillera of the Andes mountain range and lesser cordilleras. Parts of it lay within the basin of the Amazon River, and other parts within the basin of the Río de La Plata.  The surface area of the department is 51,524 square kilometers.  The topography of central Chuquisaca consists of a series of ridges rising up to 1500 m  that run north and south with flat valleys between the ridges. To the west of these ridges abruptly rise the Andes Mountains to 3000 m forming a prepuna landmass that is cut into by large river valleys that drain into the Amazon or Rio de la Plata river basins. To the east of the central ridges lies a stretch of territory containing low elevation flat Chaco topography. 90% of the land in the department of Chuquisaca has an inclination of 70% or more.

Demographics

Ecological and vegetation zones
Ecological and vegetation zones in the department of Chuquisaca vary widely according to a diversity of abiotic factors including soil formation and textures, rainfall patterns, and mineral and salinity content of water. Elevation plays an important role in the dispersion of vegetation species and wider ecosystems as they respond to microclimates. As the Andes Mountains became uplifted, plants adapted to dryer and higher microclimates resulting in a high level of speciation especially in the dry forest river valleys of the Bolivian-Tucuman formation.  colder and drier air from more austral parts of South America have resulted in migration of plant communities with a floristic connection to those in Argentina, Paraguay and Southern Brazil as opposed to more tropical plant communities that result from warm and moist northern climates.  Navarro and Ferreira have developed a database of plant species in Bolivia and identified 39 separate vegetation zones in Bolivia within twelve general physiographic-biogeographical units of which four fall in the boundaries of Chuquisaca Department including:  Cordillera Oriental Central y Meridional, Prepuna or High Interandean Valleys, Bolivian-Tucuman Formation, and Chaco.  Using Navarro and Ferreira's categories and descriptions based on vegetation zones, the geographical and ecological characteristics of the Chuquisaca Department can be described as follows.

Cordillera Oriental Central y Meridional. From an elevation of 3200m in Chuquisaca to nearly 6000 meters in Potosi, this zone is characterized by the puna, altoandean, and subnival and nival ecological zones with a pluviestacional subhumid bioclimate.

Prepuna or High Interandean Valley. From 2300m to 3200m, this zone is characterized by a mesotropical dry xeric bioclimatic zone. Seasonally torrential waters and salinity levels affect regional vegetation patterns in this zone.

Bolivian-Tucuman Formation. With a wide elevation range between 600m to 3900m this zone contains pluviestacional subhumid and locally humid bioclimatic zones. The high elevation Rio Grande and Pilcomayo river valleys transect this unit and are characterized by dry xeric vegetation zones with endemic and varied speciation especially in the Rio Grande river valley and vegetation influence from the Chaco in the Pilcomayo river valley.  Wet forest ecosystems like those found in more northern Yungas valleys are found on high ridges where clouds form.

Chaco: from 400 to 900 m this unit is characterized by a xeric bioclimate. Sandy soils in this unit were formed from alluvial processes from the Parapeti and Grande rivers. Soil drainage affects vegetation dispersion within this unit.

Human Ecological Impacts
With a human population of 631,000 people humans are a part of the ecology of Chuquisaca.  The grazing of cattle and introduction of invasive feral citrus trees has affected the native plant populations in the department. Native forests and ecosystems have contracted as land has been converted to pasture and erosion is widespread as a result of human agricultural activities on steep slopes.

Government
The chief executive office of Bolivia departments (since May 2010) is the governor; until then, the office was called the prefect, and until 2006 the prefect was appointed by the president of Bolivia. The current governor, Esteban Urquizu Cuéllar of the Movement for Socialism – Political Instrument for the Sovereignty of the Peoples was elected on 4 April 2010.

Legislative Assembly
Under the 2009 Constitution, each Bolivian department has an elected Departmental Legislative Assembly. The first elections were held 4 April 2010. The majority party in the twenty-one member assembly is the Movement towards Socialism (MAS-IPSP) with 15 seats. Four seats are held by We Are All Chuquisaca. Two seats were selected by the Guaraní people through usos y costumbres.

Provinces
The department is divided into 10 provinces which are further subdivided into municipalities and cantons.

History
The native inhabitants were the Charcas, who were dispersed along riverbanks and lowlands. Their leaders, jampiris, sorcerers, and priests resided in the capital, Choque-Chaca, which according to 17th century chronicles had a population of several thousand.

The capital city of Sucre
Sucre (elev. 2750 m) is called the city of the four names, each name corresponding to a different period of its history. It was founded by the Spaniard Pedro de Anzures in 1538. It thrived due to its regional proximity to the famous silver mines of Potosi, and as Charcas served as capital of the Real Audiencia de Charcas, encompassing all of current Bolivia's territory and more. Reverting to its native name of Chuquisaca, it was the Upper Peru's chief administrative center and largest city. It was there that the first public call for independence from Spain took place, on May 25, 1809, and where the Act of Independence from Spanish rule was signed on August 6, 1825. It was immediately designated the capital of independent Bolivia, under the auspices of Simon Bolivar and Antonio Jose de Sucre. Years later, the city of Chuquisaca was renamed Sucre in honor of the Venezuelan-born hero of South America's independence, who had served as the first effective administrator of the country (and second president).

When the center of political and economic power shifted north, to the tin-producing regions of Oruro and La Paz, Sucre's importance waned, leading to the displacement of the legislative and executive powers to La Paz. However, in honor of Sucre's historical preponderance, the judicial branch (Supreme Court) continues to operate there, and the city's official status as capital of the country was never revoked.

Languages 
The languages spoken in the department are mainly Spanish and Quechua. The following table shows the number of those belonging to the recognized group of speakers.

Places of interest 
 El Palmar Integrated Management Natural Area

Villages
 

Alcalá, Tomina

Notable people
 Isabel Calvimontes (1790-1855), one of the Patricias Argentinas
 María Guadalupe Cuenca (1790-1854), 19th-century letter writer

See also 
 Provinces of Bolivia
 Oroncota, Yampara settlement and Inca fortress

References

External links
 Chuquisaca Travel Guide
 Weather in Chuquisaca
 Bolivian Music and Web Varieties
 Full information of Chuquisaca Department
 

 
Departments of Bolivia